This article details the qualifying phase for triathlon at the 2016 Summer Olympics. The competition at these Games will comprise a total of 110 athletes coming from their respective NOCs; each has been allowed to enter a maximum of three for the first eight NOCs, while the remaining nations are limited to two. All athletes must undergo a qualifying process to earn a spot for the Games through the Continental Qualification Events, the World Qualification Event, and then the Olympic Qualification List that begin on May 15, 2014 and then conclude two years later on the same date.

The winners of each of the five Continental Qualification Events are selected to compete for the Games, followed by the top three finishers at the 2015 ITU World Qualification Event in Rio de Janeiro, Brazil. Thirty-nine athletes for each gender must directly qualify through the Olympic Qualification List as of May 15, 2016, ensuring that the first eight NOCs qualifying for positions are subjected to a maximum of three, and then the remaining NOCs to a limit to two. Host nation Brazil has guaranteed a single place for each gender, while further two berths are made available to NOCs through a Tripartite Invitation Commission.  In the end, further five places are distributed to the NOCs without any quota through the ITU Points List.

Summary

Timeline

Men's event

Women's event

Notes
1. South Africa has awarded a quota place through the continental qualifier, but later declined, as SASCOC made an agreement on the Rio 2016 Olympics qualification criteria that the continental route would not be considered.

References

Qualification for the 2016 Summer Olympics
Triathlon